Slavíkov is a municipality and village in Havlíčkův Brod District in the Vysočina Region of the Czech Republic. It has about 300 inhabitants.

Administrative parts
Villages of Dlouhý, Dolní Vestec, Horní Vestec, Kocourov, Rovný, Štikov and Zálesí are administrative parts of Slavíkov.

References

Villages in Havlíčkův Brod District